Argunovo is a rural locality (a village) and the administrative center of Argunovskoye Rural Settlement, Nikolsky District, Vologda Oblast, Russia. The population was 256 as of 2002. There are 7 streets.

Geography 
Argunovo is located 47 km northwest of Nikolsk (the district's administrative centre) by road. Semenka is the nearest rural locality.

References 

Rural localities in Nikolsky District, Vologda Oblast